The Hungarian Workers' Democratic Center Party (MDDCP), was a minor political party in Hungary between 1989 and 1993.

History
The party was established by Tibor Majoros, previously a Hungarian Democratic Forum (MDF) politician, and his followers in Tápiószele. According to its programme, the MDDCP represented the interests of the manual workers, pensioners and women's equality. The party declared its distance from the Hungarian Socialist Party (MSZP) and all opposition parties, excluding Fidesz. Majoros was the party's only candidate in the 1990 parliamentary election and received 973 votes, gaining 0.02 percent of the votes. The MDDCP dissolved in May 1993.

Election results

National Assembly

References

Sources

Defunct political parties in Hungary
Political parties established in 1989
Political parties disestablished in 1993
1989 establishments in Hungary
1993 disestablishments in Hungary
Centrist parties in Hungary